Twendi, or Cambap as it is also known, is a nearly extinct Mambiloid language of Cameroon. Speakers have largely shifted to the closely related language Kwanja, and Twendi has not been passed down to children for decades.  The language is spoken in the villages of Cambap and Sanga on the Tikar Plain by no more than 30 people, the youngest of whom were born in the 1940s.

Classification
Twendi is a Mambiloid language belonging to the Mambila group. Speakers consider Twendi to be a dialect of Kwanja, but lexical evidence from a variety of Mambiloid languages, especially Kabri, indicates its affinity to the Mambila group.

References

External links
 Twendi at EndangeredLanguages.com
 Moribund languages of the Nigeria-Cameroon borderland

Mambiloid languages
Languages of Cameroon